A monopteros (Ancient Greek: , from the Polytonic: μόνος, 'only, single, alone', and , 'wing') is a circular colonnade supporting a roof but without any walls. Unlike a tholos (in its wider sense as a circular building), it does not have walls making a cella or room inside. In Greek and especially Roman antiquity, the term could also be used for a tholos. In ancient times, monopteroi served inter alia as a form of baldachin for a cult image. An example of this is the  Monument of Lysicrates in Athens, albeit the spaces between the columns were walled in, even in ancient times. The Temple of Rome and Augustus on the Athenian Acropolis is a monopteros from Roman times, with open spaces between the columns. Cyriacus of Ancona, a 15th-century traveller, handed down his architrave inscription: Ad praefatae Palladis Templi vestibulum.

A monopteros (or monopteron) is also known as cyclostyle (from the Greek words for "circle" and "column"). The adjectives are monopteral and cyclostylar.

In Baroque and Classical architecture, a monopteros as a pavilion, often given a classical name such as a "muses' temple" is a popular garden feature in English and French gardens. The monopteros also occurs in German parks, as in the English Garden in Munich and in Hayns Park in Hamburg-Eppendorf. Many wells in parks and spa centres have the appearance of a monopteros. Many monopteroi have staffage structures like a porticus, placed in front of the monopteros. These also have only a decorative function, because they are not needed in order to provide an entrance to a temple that is open on all sides.

Many monopteroi are described as rotundas due to their circular floor plan. The tholos also goes by that name. However, many monopteroi have square or polygonal plans, that would not be described as rotundas. An example is the Muses' Temple with the muse, Polyhymnia, in the grounds of Tiefurt House, that has a hexagonal floor plan.



Examples

See also
Belvedere (structure)
Eyecatchers
Gazebo
 Aedicule: often not free-standing
 Baldachin (canopy)
 Ciborium (canopy)
 Cupola on top of a dome

References

Literature 
 Wolfgang Binder: Der Roma-Augustus Monopteros auf der Akropolis in Athen und sein typologischer Ort. Karlsruhe 1969.
 Ingrid Weibezahn: Geschichte und Funktion des Monopteros. Untersuchungen zu einem Gebäudetyp des Spätbarock und des Klassizismus. Hildesheim 1975, . Online:  (Google Books)

External links 

Wiesbaden monopteros - 360° panorama
Photographs and historical background to the Leibniz Temple in Hanover

Columns and entablature
Temples in Greece
Rotundas (architecture)
Buildings and structures by shape
Garden features